Lip Gloss and Black is the second single from American metalcore band Atreyu's debut album, Suicide Notes and Butterfly Kisses released in 2002. The song features the lyrics "Live, Love, Burn, Die" which has become one of Atreyu's signature phrases and one of Alex Varkatzas's most noted lyrics. The song itself was one of the first Atreyu songs to gain them mainstream attention, with the video being played extensively on MTV2 and Uranium.

Music video
The music video features footage of bondage between two loved ones, intercut with footage of the band performing at the Showcase Theatre in Corona, California. While previous bass player Chris Thompson performs in the video, future and current Atreyu bass player, Mark McKnight, is seen in the crowd during the performance.

Track listing

Personnel
Atreyu
 Alex Varkatzas – lead vocals
 Dan Jacobs – lead guitar
 Travis Miguel – rhythm guitar
 Chris Thomson – bass
 Brandon Saller – drums, clean vocals

Additional personnel
 Jaime Boepple – piano

References

Atreyu (band) songs
Victory Records singles
2002 songs
2002 singles